Polymerase delta-interacting protein 2 also known as Polymerase delta-interacting protein of 38 kDa (PDIP38) is encoded by the POLDIP2 gene in humans.

This gene encodes a protein that interacts with the DNA polymerase delta p50 subunit. The encoded protein also interacts with proliferating cell nuclear antigen. Some transcripts of this gene overlap in a tail-to-tail orientation with the gene for tumor necrosis factor, alpha-induced protein 1 (TNFAIP1). POLDIP2 / PDIP38 is a moonlighting protein that has been identified in both the nucleus  and the mitochondrion

Interactions 

In the nucleus, POLDIP2 has been shown to interact with PCNA, while in the mitochondrion POLDIP2 has been shown to interact with proteins constituting the mitochondrial DNA nucleoid  and the AAA+ protease CLPXP  where it modulates both the specificity and stability of this proteolytic machine.

References

Further reading